Dennis Allen Burtt (born November 29, 1957) is former Major League Baseball pitcher who played for the Minnesota Twins in  and .

Burtt attended Villa Park High School where he was teammates on the school's baseball team with Kevin Costner.

Burtt served as the pitching coach for the New Britain Red Sox of the Eastern League in 1993 and 1994.

References

External links
 
Retrosheet
Venezuelan Professional Baseball League

1957 births
Albuquerque Dukes players
Baseball players from San Diego
Bend Bandits players
Bristol Red Sox players
Elmira Pioneers players
Leones del Caracas players
American expatriate baseball players in Venezuela
Living people
Major League Baseball pitchers
Minnesota Twins players
Pawtucket Red Sox players
Santa Ana Dons baseball players
Toledo Mud Hens players
Winter Haven Red Sox players